The 105th Virginia General Assembly was the meeting of the legislative branch of the Virginia state government from 1908 to 1910, after the 1907 state elections. It convened in Richmond for one session.

Background

Party summary
Resignations and new members are discussed in the "Changes in membership" section, below.

Senate

House of Delegates

Senate

Leadership

Members

Changes in membership

Senate
August 4, 1909, William C. White (D-18th district) dies. His seat remained unfilled until the next regular session.

See also
 List of Virginia state legislatures

References

Government of Virginia
Virginia legislative sessions
1908 in Virginia
1909 in Virginia
1908 U.S. legislative sessions
1909 U.S. legislative sessions